The 2011 NRL Under-20s season was the fourth season of the National Rugby League's Under-20s competition. The competition, known commercially as the 2011 Toyota Cup due to sponsorship from Toyota, was solely for under-20s players. The draw and structure of the competition mirrored that of the 2011 NRL Telstra Premiership season.

Season summary

Schedule

Ladder

Finals series

Player statistics

Leading try scorers

Most tries in a game

Leading point scorers

Most points in a game

Leading goal scorers

Most goals in a game

Leading field goal scorers

Club statistics

Biggest Wins

Winning Streaks

 QF = Qualifying Finals
 SF = Semi-finals
 PF = Preliminary Finals
 GF = Grand Final

Losing Streaks

 QF = Qualifying Finals
 SF = Semi-finals
 PF = Preliminary Finals
 GF = Grand Final

Team of the Year
On 30 August 2011, the 2011 Toyota Cup team of the Year was announced. The team included 15 first time winners including coach John Ackland, while Dane Gagai and Dale Finucane had previously been named in the 2010 Team of the Year. Kenneath Bromwich and Jesse Bromwich, a member of the 2009 Team of the Year, became the first brothers to be selected in a team of the Year.

References

External links
NRL.com - Official site of the NYC, National Youth Competition